Liv is a Finnish television channel owned and operated by Nelonen. Liv started broadcasting on 14 February 2009 and it is especially designed for women viewers, featuring series such as Arvostele Mun Illallinen Suomessa, Kumman kaa , Äitien sota and Suomen täydelliset venäläisnaiset.

References

External links
 Liv official website 

Television channels and stations established in 2009
Television channels in Finland